The 1990 Virginia Slims of Los Angeles was a women's tennis tournament played on outdoor hard courts at the Manhattan Country Club in Manhattan Beach, California in the United States that was part of the Tier II category of the 1990 WTA Tour. It was the 17th edition of the tournament and was held from August 13 through August 19, 1990. Second-seeded Monica Seles won the singles title and earned $70,000 first-prize money.

Finals

Singles
 Monica Seles defeated  Martina Navratilova 6–4, 3–6, 7–6(8–6)
 It was Seles' 7th singles title of the year and the 8th of her career.

Doubles
 Gigi Fernández /  Jana Novotná defeated  Mercedes Paz /  Gabriela Sabatini 6–3, 4–6, 6–4

References

External links
 ITF tournament edition details
 Tournament draws

Virginia Slims of Los Angeles
LA Women's Tennis Championships
Sports competitions in Manhattan Beach, California
Virginia Slims of Los Angeles
Virginia Slims of Los Angeles
Virginia Slims of Los Angeles
Virginia Slims of Los Angeles